Richard Grantham (1677–1723), of Goltho Hall, Lincolnshire, was an English politician who sat in the House of Commons between 1710 and 1722.

Grantham was the eldest surviving son of Vincent Grantham of Goltho Hall, Lincolnshire, and his wife Margaret Fanshaw, daughter of Sir Richard Fanshaw of Ware Park, Hertfordshire. He was educated at Eton College in 1690. He married Elizabeth and had no children.

Grantham was elected Member of Parliament  for Lincoln at the 1710 general election, but was defeated in 1713. He was returned unopposed as MP for Lincoln at the 1715 general election and in 1716 was appointed Commissioner for forfeited estates following the Jacobite rebellion. He received a salary of £1,000 a year but was absent from the role for two years and in the third year was fined for non-attendance. He was defeated at the poll in the 1722 general election.

Grantham died on 28 January 1723.

References

1677 births
1723 deaths
People educated at Eton College
People from West Lindsey District
Members of the Parliament of Great Britain for English constituencies
British MPs 1710–1713
British MPs 1715–1722